The electoral district of Burwood was an electorate for the Victorian Legislative Assembly in Australia. It was located approximately 13 kilometres east of Melbourne, and covered an area of 25 km2. The seat included the suburbs of Ashburton, Ashwood, Box Hill South, Burwood, Chadstone, and parts of Camberwell, Canterbury, Glen Iris, and Surrey Hills. It was created in 1955 as part of the expansion of the Legislative Assembly, and abolished in 1967, replaced by Glen Iris. Burwood was recreated in 1976, replacing Glen Iris.

The seat's most notable member was Jeff Kennett, who won the seat on its recreation in 1976 and went on to serve as leader of the Liberal Party from 1982 to 1989 and from 1991 to 1999, and as Premier of Victoria from 1992 to 1999. Kennett retired after his government's shock defeat at the 1999 election. In the ensuring by-election, his Labor opponent in the general election, Bob Stensholt, won the previously safe Liberal seat on a swing of over 10 percent.

Stensholt went on to hold the seat in his own right for two more terms before Graham Watt regained it for the Liberals. However, he lost his seat at the 2018 Victorian state election to Labor candidate Will Fowles.

The seat was abolished by the Electoral Boundaries Commission ahead of the 2022 election and replaced by the electoral district of Ashwood.

Members for Burwood

Election results

References

External links
 Electorate profile: Burwood, Victorian Electoral Commission

Former electoral districts of Victoria (Australia)
1955 establishments in Australia
1967 disestablishments in Australia
1976 establishments in Australia